Hasbrouck House may refer to:
Stow-Hasbrouck House, a National Register of Historic Places listing in Calhoun County, Michigan
Josiah Hasbrouck House, a house in Locust Lawn Estate in Gardiner, New York
Maj. Jacob Hasbrouck Jr. House in the Huguenot Street Historic District in New Paltz, New York
Jean Hasbrouck House, a National Historic Landmark in the Huguenot Street Historic District in New Paltz, New York
Washington's Headquarters State Historic Site or Hasbrouck House, a National Historic Landmark in Newburgh, New York
Hasbrouck House (Poughkeepsie, New York), a Romanesque home
Hasbrouck House (Woodbourne, New York), a stone house